Alejandro Mendoza (born 2 February 1990) is a Bolivian tennis player.

Mendoza has a career high ATP singles ranking of 741 achieved on 1 August 2016. He also has a career high ATP doubles ranking of 823 achieved on 8 September 2014.

Mendoza represents Bolivia at the Davis Cup where he has a W/L record of 3–0.

External links

1990 births
Living people
Bolivian male tennis players
Sportspeople from La Paz